The 1942 Detroit Tigers season was a season in American baseball. The team finished fifth in the American League with a record of 73–81, 30 games behind the New York Yankees.

Offseason
 Prior to the 1942 season: Neil Berry was signed as an amateur free agent by the Tigers.

Regular season

Season standings

Record vs. opponents

Notable transactions 
 April 30, 1942: Schoolboy Rowe was purchased from the Tigers by the Brooklyn Dodgers.

Roster

Player stats

Batting

Starters by position 
Note: Pos = Position; G = Games played; AB = At bats; H = Hits; Avg. = Batting average; HR = Home runs; RBI = Runs batted in

Other batters 
Note: G = Games played; AB = At bats; H = Hits; Avg. = Batting average; HR = Home runs; RBI = Runs batted in

Pitching

Starting pitchers 
Note: G = Games pitched; IP = Innings pitched; W = Wins; L = Losses; ERA = Earned run average; SO = Strikeouts

Other pitchers 
Note: G = Games pitched; IP = Innings pitched; W = Wins; L = Losses; ERA = Earned run average; SO = Strikeouts

Relief pitchers 
Note: G = Games pitched; W = Wins; L = Losses; SV = Saves; ERA = Earned run average; SO = Strikeouts

Farm system 

LEAGUE CHAMPIONS: Jamestown

KITTY League folded, June 19, 1942

Notes

External links 

1942 Detroit Tigers season at Baseball Reference

Detroit Tigers seasons
Detroit Tigers season
Detroit Tigers
1942 in Detroit